Pedro Jesús Azogue Rojas (born 6 December 1994) is a Bolivian footballer who currently plays for Bolívar.

International career
He also plays for the Bolivia's U-20 team where he is the team's captain. As of June 2016, he has capped 4 FIFA World Cup qualification matches.

References

External links 
 
 

1994 births
Living people
Sportspeople from Santa Cruz de la Sierra
Association football forwards
Bolivian footballers
Bolivia international footballers
Copa América Centenario players
Oriente Petrolero players
Club Bolívar players